Dawson City Airport  is located  east of Dawson City, Yukon, Canada, in the Klondike River valley, and is operated by the Yukon government. It has a terminal building and a runway which was paved in May 2019. A number of studies have recommended moving the airport or realigning the runway as it is in a narrow mountain valley.

The airport is classified as an airport of entry by Nav Canada and is staffed by the Canada Border Services Agency (CBSA). CBSA officers at this airport can normally handle aircraft with up to 15 passengers, but are equipped to handle daily Boeing 737 charters between Dawson City and Fairbanks (Fairbanks International Airport) during the peak summer tourism season.

Airlines and destinations

See also
Dawson City Water Aerodrome

References

External links
Page about this airport  on COPA's Places to Fly airport directory

Certified airports in Yukon
Buildings and structures in Dawson City